Kizzire is a surname. Notable people with the surname include:

Lee Kizzire (1915–1943), American football player 
Patton Kizzire (born 1986), American golfer